Hainan Korean Ethnic Township is a Korean ethnic township under the administration of Xi'an District, Mudanjiang, in Heilongjiang, China. , it has 11 villages and one forest area under its administration.

References 

Township-level divisions of Heilongjiang
Mudanjiang
Korean diaspora in China
Ethnic townships of the People's Republic of China